A by-election was held for the New South Wales Legislative Assembly electorate of Upper Hunter on 15 April 1861 because of the resignation of John Robertson. Roberston had resigned as Premier on 9 January 1861 to concentrate on the passage of the Robertson Land Acts, which would open up the free selection of Crown land. The bills were passed by the Legislative Assembly on 26 March 1861, and Robertson resigned to be appointed to the Legislative Council to ensure their passage into law.

Dates

Results

John Robertson resigned to be appointed to the Legislative Council to ensure the passage of the Robertson Land Acts into law.

Aftermath

The Robertson Lands Acts became law on 18 October 1861. John Robertson resigned from the Legislative Council on 30 December 1861, and returned to the Legislative Assembly on 7 January 1862, unopposed at the 1862 Shoalhaven by-election.

See also
Electoral results for the district of Upper Hunter
List of New South Wales state by-elections

References

1861 elections in Australia
New South Wales state by-elections
1860s in New South Wales